Ectinothorax is a genus of beetles in the family Carabidae, containing the following species:

 Ectinothorax assimilis Fairmaire, 1903
 Ectinothorax feronoides Alluaud, 1941
 Ectinothorax longicollis Jeannel, 1948
 Ectinothorax mathiauxi Jeannel, 1948
 Ectinothorax sulcator Fairmaire, 1903

References

Harpalinae